Vincent McCormack (4 July 1892 – 2 April 1966) was a Jamaican cricketer. He played in one first-class match for the Jamaican cricket team in 1925/26.

See also
 List of Jamaican representative cricketers

References

External links
 

1892 births
1966 deaths
Jamaican cricketers
Jamaica cricketers
Sportspeople from Kingston, Jamaica